Porter Hazelton (November 15, 1812 – August 15, 1870) was a Michigan politician.

Early life
With his two brothers, George and Edgar, and Ezekial Ewing constructed a bridge across the Flint River for the State of Michigan.  With no money to pay them, they received most of the now Hazelton Township in Shiwassee County to the partners which they proceeded to sell to settlers and the Township and an unincorporated village was named after them.

Political life
Hazelton served as Flint Township, Michigan Supervisor in 1852 to 1854.  A source indicates that he was elected as the fifth mayor of the Village of Flint in 1859 serving a one-year term. while two other shows William M. Fenton serving another term.

References

Mayors of Flint, Michigan
1812 births
1870 deaths
19th-century American politicians